Sir Coplestone Bampfylde, 2nd Bt., DL,
JP  (ca. 1633 – 9 February 1692) of Poltimore and North Molton and Warleigh, Tamerton Foliot, in Devon, was an English politician who sat in the House of Commons at various times between 1659 and 1689.

Origins
Bampfylde was the eldest son of Sir John Bampfylde, 1st Baronet (1590–1650), of Poltimore and North Molton, by his wife, Gertrude Coplestone, 4th daughter of Amyas Coplestone and co-heiress of her brother John Coplestone of Copplestone in the parish of Colebrooke and of Warleigh in the parish of Tamerton Foliot, Devon. His brother-in-law was Sir William Morice, 1st Baronet, husband of his sister Gertrude Bampfylde.

Career
He matriculated at Corpus Christi College, Oxford on 20 March 1651, where he befriended Sir John Drake, 1st Baronet. 

He succeeded to the baronetcy in 1651 on the death of his father. He was nominated Justice of the Peace for Devon in 1656 and one year later became a Commissioner for Assessment. 

In 1659, Bampfylde was elected Member of Parliament for Tiverton, Devon, in the Third Protectorate Parliament. Although his father and two of his uncles were considered Roundheads (Parliamentarians), Bampfylde himself was a very active Royalist. 

In February 1660, he delivered a petition from Devon's population for more rights to the king's general George Monck, on the discovery of which by Parliament he was temporarily imprisoned in the Tower of London. 

In 1660, he was appointed a Commissioner of Militia, serving subsequently as colonel of the Devon Militia. He became the first High Sheriff of Devon after the Restoration of the Monarchy and toured the Western Circuit as a Commissioner of Oyer and Terminer. He was a Deputy Lieutenant of Devon from 1661 and worked as Commissioner for Corporations in the following two years. 

In 1671, Bampfylde was elected MP for Devon in 1671 in a by-election to the Cavalier Parliament which seat he held until 1679. He was reasonably diligent as an MP, until the outbreak of the Popish Plot in the autumn of 1678, when the hysterical political atmosphere caused him to retire to his home. He generally voted with the Court party, especially after his second marriage, when he was much influenced by his father-in-law, Sir Courtenay Pole, who enjoyed the personal regard of Charles II. He was again elected MP for Devon in 1685 and held the seat until 1689. He initially welcomed the Glorious Revolution, but in his last years became a stern critic of the new regime.

Greets Grand Duke of Tuscany
Sir Coplestone Bampfylde is mentioned in the Travel Journal of Cosimo III de' Medici, Grand Duke of Tuscany (1642–1723) in connection with his visit to Plymouth on 5 April 1669:<ref>Magalotti, Lorenzo, Conte, 1637–1712, Travels of Cosmo the Third, Grand Duke of Tuscany, through England during the Reign of King Charles the Second (1669), Translated from the Italian Manuscript in the Laurentian Library at Florence. To which is Prefixed, a Memoir of his Life, London, 1821, pp. 126-127 </ref> 
"The governor then came to take leave, and afterwards Sir Richard Edgecumbe and Mr. Prideaux came in, to wish his highness a good journey. About three they dined, and towards five, took their departure; his Highness being attended by the governor on horseback, who, when they had got two miles from Plymouth, appeared at the coach-door, to take leave once more. He had wished to have paraded the military, as was done on his highness's arrival, but the latter courteously declined it. When they had proceeded about a mile after the governor's departure, there came galloping up to the coach, Sir Copleston Bampfylde, with his wife and sister. They happened to be hunting in that neighbourhood and wished not to lose the opportunity of performing an act of respect to his highness. The serene prince stopped the carriage, and received their compliments, but did not alight to salute them, not knowing, till afterwards, who the ladies were''".

Marriage and progeny
He married twice:
Firstly on 16 November 1655 to Margaret Bulkeley, daughter of Francis Bulkeley of Burgate, Hampshire, by whom he had two sons and a daughter: 
Col. Hugh Bampfield (d. 1690), eldest son and heir apparent, who predeceased his father having died in a fall from his horse. He married Mary Clifford, daughter of James Clifford of Ware, by whom he had a son Sir Coplestone Bampfylde, 3rd Baronet.
Coplestone Bampfylde (1659–1669), 2nd son, a precocious scholar who died young aged 10 and whose monument survives on the south side of the chancel in St Mary's Church, Tamerton Foliot. His effigy, dressed like an adult man, is shown seated at a desk with hand on a book and wears a gown and band with a large bushy wig. Below are elaborate inscriptions in Latin and Greek.
John Coplestone Bulkeley Bampfield, 3rd son, who died without issue. 
Margaret Bampfield, died an infant.
Secondly at Houghton, South Devon, on 21 October 1674 to Jane Pole, daughter of Sir Courtenay Pole, 2nd Baronet of Shute, Devon and his wife Urith Shapcote; without progeny. She remarried Edward Gibbons.

Character
He was tall, strongly built and handsome, with "ready wit and good judgment"; in manner "a true gentleman, courteous and obliging". His luxurious way of life caused him to live beyond his income for many years.

Death and burial
Bampfyle died of gout at Warleigh and was buried at Poltimore. On his deathbed, he required his assembled family to pledge loyalty to the Church of England and to the crown.

Succession
His eldest son Hugh Bampfield having predeceased him by one year, he was succeeded in the baronetcy by his grandson Sir Coplestone Bampfylde, 3rd Baronet.

References

1630s births
1692 deaths
Alumni of Corpus Christi College, Oxford
Baronets in the Baronetage of England
Cavaliers
Deputy Lieutenants of Devon
High Sheriffs of Devon
English MPs 1659
English MPs 1661–1679
English MPs 1685–1687
English justices of the peace
Members of the Parliament of England (pre-1707) for Devon